Nello Bartolini (13 June 1904 – 19 March 1956) was an Italian long-distance runner and steeplechase runner who competed at the 1928 Summer Olympics, and at the 1932 Summer Olympics.

Biography
In the 1930s, he was famous in Italy for his sport rivalry with the Florentine fellow and teammate of the Giglio Rosso, Giuseppe Lippi.

Achievements

National titles
He won eight national championships at individual senior level.

Italian Athletics Championships
5000 metres: 1930
3000 metres steeplechase: 1926, 1927, 1931, 1932, 1934
Cross country: 1931. 1932

References

External links
 
 Nello Bartolini at ASSI Giglio Rosso Hall of Fame

1904 births
1956 deaths
Sportspeople from Florence
Athletes (track and field) at the 1928 Summer Olympics
Athletes (track and field) at the 1932 Summer Olympics
Italian male cross country runners
Italian male long-distance runners
Italian male steeplechase runners
Olympic athletes of Italy